Parnassus or Parnassos was a town  in the northern part of ancient Cappadocia, on the right bank of the Halys River, and on or near a hill, to which it owed its name, on the road between Ancyra and Archelais, about 63 miles west of the latter town. It became a bishopric and remains a Roman Catholic titular see.

History 
As a town in the Late Roman province of Cappadocia Tertia, Parnassus was important enough to become a suffragan bishopric of the Metropolitan of Mocissus, in the sway of the Patriarchate of Constantinople. Its site is near modern Değirmenyolu.

Several of its bishops were historically documented :
 Pancratius, an Arian heretical schismatic, among the dissident bishops which left the Council of Sardica and held a small council at Philippopolis (now Plovdiv Bulgaria) issuing a separate Arian position. 
 Ipsius and Ecditius, whom Church Father Saint Basil the Great of Caesarea Mazaca in Cappadocia mentioned in a letter
 Eustachius I participated over his 30 years term in various major synods: the council of Ephesus in 431, opposing the profession of faith; the Synod of Constantinople of 448 convoked by Patriarch Flavian of Constantinople to condemn heretical anti-Nestorian archimandrite Eutyches; the Council of Chalcedon in 451; he also signed in 458 the letter of the bishops of Cappadocia to Byzantine emperor Leo I the Thracian after the Coptic mob-murder of Patriarch Proterius of Alexandria and signed the synodal decree of Patriarch (saint) Gennadius of Constantinople against simony around 459.
 Pelagius prese partook in the synod of Constantinople in 536 which Patriarch Mena called to condemn Antimus
 Eustachius II was present at the 'Robber' Council in Trullo in 692
 Stephanus attended the Second Council of Nicaea in 787
 Teognostus participated at the Council of Constantinople in 879-880 condemning Patriarch Photius I of Constantinople.

The bishopric is mentioned in the Byzantine imperial Notitiae Episcopatuum till the late 13th century, but it faded, apparently at the advent of Muslim Seljuks.

Titular see 
The diocese was nominally restored as a titular bishopric in 1895.
 
It is vacant, having had the following incumbents, all of the lowest (episcopal) rank :
 Johann Baptist Schneider (1896.06.25 – death 1905.01.26) as Auxiliary Bishop of Wien (Vienna, Austria) (1896.06.25 – 1905.01.26)
 Ludovic Joseph Legraive (1907.10.17 – death 1940.06.10) as Auxiliary Bishop of Mechelen (Mechlin, Belgium) (1907.10.17 – 1940.06.10)
 Arturo Mery Beckdorf (1941.03.22 – 1944.07.29), later Titular Archbishop of Phasis (1955.04.20 – 1976.05.28)
 Daniel Figueroa Villón (1945.04.12 – 1946.09.22) as Auxiliary Bishop of Antofagasta (Chile) (1941.03.22 – 1944.07.29); later Coadjutor Bishop of Valdivia (Chile) (1944.07.29 – 1955.04.20), Coadjutor Archbishop of Santiago (Chile) (1955.04.20 – 1961.05.14), Titular Archbishop of Phasis (1955.04.20 – 1976.05.28) as Auxiliary Bishop of La Serena (Chile) (1961.05.14 – 1963) promoted Coadjutor Archbishop of La Serena (Chile) (1963 – death 1976.05.28)
 Daniel Tavares Baeta Neves (1947.03.29 – 1958.05.16) as Auxiliary Bishop of Mariana (Brazil) (1947.03.29 – 1958.05.16); later Bishop of Januária (Brazil) (1958.05.16 – 1962.06.01), Titular Bishop of Alexandria Minor (1962.06.01 – 1964.06.04), Bishop of Sete Lagoas (Brazil) (1964.06.04 – death 1980.07.08)
 Adolfo Luís Bossi, Capuchin Friars (O.F.M. Cap.) (1958.06.18 – 2002.05.08) as Coadjutor Bishop-Prelate of São José do Grajaú (Brazil) (1958.06.18 – 1966.02.19), succeeding as Bishop-Prelate of São José do Grajaú (1966.02.19 – retired 1970.08.22), died 2002.

References

External links 
 GigaCatholic, with titular incumbent links
 
 Bibliography
 Pius Bonifacius Gams, Series episcoporum Ecclesiae Catholicae, Leipzig 1931, p. 440
 Michel Lequien, Oriens christianus in quatuor Patriarchatus digestus, Paris 1740, Vol. I, coll. 415-418
 Sophrone Pétridès, lemma 'Parnassus' in Catholic Encyclopedia, vol. XI, New York 1911

Catholic titular sees in Asia
Suppressed Roman Catholic dioceses
Populated places in ancient Cappadocia
Former populated places in Turkey
Populated places of the Byzantine Empire
Roman towns and cities in Turkey
History of Ankara Province